Ahmad I ibn Abi Bakr was Emir of Harar from 1755 to 1782. He made several successful military expeditions against the Oromo around the city of Harar, which probably helped to keep the trade routes open west to Shewa and east to Zeila.

See also
List of emirs of Harar
Harar

Notes 

Emirs of Harar